¿Quién es la máscara? (Spanish for Who is the Mask?) is an Argentine talent reality television series produced by Telefe and Paramount Networks Americas. It is based on the South Korean television show King of Mask Singer created by Seo Chang-man. The series is hosted by Natalia Oreiro and premiered on September 12, 2022, with the series finale airing on October 13.

Format
A group of celebrities hide behind a character and, episode after episode, a panel of researchers will try to discover who is behind the mask. Competitors are matched in face-off competitions and perform a song. The studio audience votes for their favorite performance and the masked singer with the most votes is safe for the week, while the celebrity with the least votes is nominated for elimination. The panelists decide which of the nominated celebrities will continue in the competition and the public saves another. The eliminated celebrity removes their mask to reveal their identity.

Panelists and host

The panel consists of businesswoman Wanda Nara, comedian and actor Roberto Moldavsky, comedian and television host Lizy Tagliani and singer Karina.

Contestants

Episodes

Episode 1 (September 12)

Episode 2 (September 13)

Episode 3 (September 14)

Episode 4 (September 15)

Episode 5 (September 18)

Episode 6 (September 19)

Episode 7 (September 20)

Episode 8 (September 21)

Episode 9 (September 22)

Episode 10 (September 25)

Episode 11 (September 26)

Episode 12 (September 27)

Episode 13 (September 28)

Episode 14 (September 29)

Episode 15 (October 2)

Episode 16 (October 3)

Episode 17 (October 4)

Episode 18 (October 5)

Episode 19 (October 6)

Episode 20 (October 9)

Episode 21 (October 10)

Episode 22 (October 11)

Episode 23 (October 12) - Semifinal

Episode 24 (October 13) - Finale

Round One

Round Two

Ratings

References

External links
 
 

2022 Argentine television series debuts
Telefe original programming
Argentine reality television series
Spanish-language television shows
2020s Argentine television series
Masked Singer